Fire is the debut solo studio album by Irish singer-songwriter and Westlife vocalist Markus Feehily. The album was released on October 16, 2015, via Harmoney Entertainment, as part of the Kobalt Music Group. The album includes the singles "Love is a Drug" and "Butterfly".

Background
In February 2015, Feehily announced that he was launching his solo career with the release of his debut single, "Love Is a Drug", which received its radio premiere on RTÉ 2fm in Ireland later that week. The next day, the track premiered online, via Wonderland Magazine. Moments after the premiere of the song, it was made available for pre-order on iTunes, with the official video for the track launching on his Vevo channel two weeks later.

Feehily also announced a one-off show at Scala in London on March 4, 2015, where he played several tracks from the upcoming record, as well as updated versions of some former Westlife classics, including "What Makes a Man" and "Flying Without Wings". "Love is a Drug" was officially released on April 19, 2015, peaking at #56 on the UK Singles Chart. Feehily released an instant great track from the album, "Find My Way", on July 14, 2015.

Feehily said of the album; "Calling my album Fire is a two-sided thing. Fire represents the dark times I went through while writing the album, but also my actual song 'Fire' from the deluxe album is about finding new love and having the strength to pull through the tough times. So it has both positive and negative sides to it just like actual fire. I was also so pleased to work with some of the best songwriters and producers in the industry. They gave me the opportunity to write and record the type of music that I've always wanted to release. Working with them was both a pleasure and an honour." Feehily worked with a number of collaborators for the project, including Mojam, Jim Eliot, Jakwob and The Nexus.

Track listing

Charts

References

2015 debut albums
Markus Feehily albums